Mike Savitch (born November 25, 1973) is a bobsledder who represented the United States Virgin Islands. He competed in the four-man event at the 2002 Winter Olympics.

References

External links
 

1973 births
Living people
United States Virgin Islands male bobsledders
Olympic bobsledders of the United States Virgin Islands
Bobsledders at the 2002 Winter Olympics
Place of birth missing (living people)